United Nations Security Council Resolution 424 was adopted unanimously on March 17, 1978; after hearing representations from Zambia, the Council expressed concern at unprovoked attacks against the country by the "illegal racist regime" in Southern Rhodesia, which resulted in deaths and destruction of property in Zambia. The Rhodesian Security Forces maintained that they had been attacking guerrilla bases in the country.

The Council recalled previous resolutions, including 423 (1978), 326 (1973), 403 (1977), 406 (1977) and 411 (1977) condemning Southern Rhodesia for its attacks in Angola, Botswana, Mozambique and Zambia which constituted a threat to international peace and security. It also reiterated its call for the liberation of the people in Zimbabwe and Namibia to secure peace in the region and condemned apartheid in South Africa. The Council added that it supports those States which support the liberation of these territories.

The resolution ends by adding that if any further acts by Southern Rhodesia are committed against neighbouring countries, the Council will determine appropriate action, and, if necessary, invoke Chapter VII.

See also
 List of United Nations Security Council Resolutions 401 to 500 (1976–1982)

References

External links
 
Text of the Resolution at undocs.org

 0424
 0424
1978 in Africa
 0424
 0424
 0424
 0424
 0424
March 1978 events
Rhodesia–Zambia relations